There are currently 64 national parks in Russia.

Overview

Until the 1960s only nature reserves and zakazniks existed in the Soviet Union, so international experience in creating a form of protected areas intended for tourists to relax and teach them to take care of nature was very important. In 1961, Soviet geographers, headed by Innokenti Gerasimov, director of the Institute of Geography, USSR Academy of Sciences, visited the United States. This trip was an introduction to the USA experience in environmental protection and Soviet scientists visited the Yellowstone National Park and the Great Smoky Mountains National Park.

After the trip, Innokenti Gerasimov returned to the idea of creating nature parks in the USSR, in 1965 he proposed the creation of a Baikal nature park. A similar natural park was also designed in the Lake Seliger area on the Valdai Hills. In 1966, the newspaper Komsomolskaya Pravda published an article by Innokenti Gerasimov and Vladimir Preobrazhensky, which discussed the need to create a system of natural parks in the USSR. Natural parks were not just thought of as places for tourists to relax, but also as places to protect animals and plants in areas that park tourists would not be allowed to visit without a guide.

The oldest parks in Russia are Sochinsky and Losiny Ostrov (1983); Samarskaya Luka (1984); Mariy Chodra (1985); Bashkiriya, Prielbrusye, Pribaykalsky, and Zabaykalsky (1986).

According to the law on the protected areas of Russia, national parks are areas of land and water devoted to nature protection, ecological education, and scientific research. They contain sites of particular ecological, historical and aesthetic value. Regulated tourism is permitted.
The area of each park is divided into zones according to various functions. There should be a strictly protected area managed as a zapovednik, and also recreational and buffer zones in which economic activity is allowed, such as tourism, traditional land use, and benign forms of agriculture and forestry. The strictly protected function is sometimes fulfilled by a neighbouring official zapovednik; for instance, Barguzin Zapovednik adjoins Zabaykalsky National Park on the east side of Lake Baikal.
In 2001 Vodlozersky National Park received UNESCO Biosphere Reserve status, followed by Smolenskoye Poozerye and Ugra National Park in 2002, and two others (Valdaysky and Kenozersky) in 2004. 

The national parks are currently the responsibility of the Ministry of Natural Resources and Environment (Russia).

List of national parks of Russia

See also

 Protected areas of Russia
 Nature Reserves (Zapovedniks) of Russia

Footnotes

External links

Biodiversity Conservation Center/Tsentr dikoy prirody, Moscow: page and map on each park, in Russian.
Centre for Russian Nature Conservation/Russian Conservation News.

 
Russia
National parks
National parks